is a town located in Rumoi, Hokkaido, Japan.

As of September 2016, the town has an estimated population of 3,241 and a density of 9.2 persons per km2. The total area is 353.31 km2.

Homer, Alaska has been the sister city of Teshio since 1984, and Tomari, Russia since 1992.

Climate

Mascot

Teshio's mascot is  who is a superhero basket clam. He is given a "te" (天)-shaped badge to symbolize his honor by people especially children and the elderly. He uses his index finger to send signals.

References

External links

Official Website 

Towns in Hokkaido